Canipsa is a genus of snout moths. It was described by Francis Walker in 1866. It is listed as a synonym of Stericta by some authors.

Species
 Canipsa atkinsonii (Moore, 1888)
 Canipsa poliochyta (Turner, 1904)
 Canipsa pyraliata (Moore, 1888)
 Canipsa subpensalis Walker, 1866

References

Epipaschiinae
Pyralidae genera